Injra railway station is  located in union council of Tarap nearMakhad. It has a police station. Injra is located in Jand Tehsil of District Attock, Punjab, Pakistan.

See also
 List of railway stations in Pakistan
 Pakistan Railways

References

External links

Railway stations in Attock District
Railway stations on Kotri–Attock Railway Line (ML 2)